Pekka Rinne (born 3 November 1982) is a Finnish former professional hockey goaltender. Drafted by the Nashville Predators in the 2004 NHL Entry Draft, Rinne became their starting goaltender during the 2008–09 season and quickly established himself as one of the NHL's best goaltenders. He won the Vezina Trophy as the NHL's best goaltender in the 2017–18 season, and was a finalist for the award four times. Rinne led the Predators to their first Stanley Cup Finals appearance in franchise history in 2017, losing to the Pittsburgh Penguins in six games.

Rinne is Nashville's franchise leader in wins and shutouts, and is a four-time NHL All-Star. He also holds the record for the most NHL wins by a Finnish-born goaltender. Rinne is one of only 13 NHL goaltenders to score a goal in either the regular season or the playoffs.

Playing career

Oulun Kärpät
Rinne was developed in Kärpät, playing predominantly for their junior team between 2000 and 2003, and for their men's team in championship-winning years 2004 and 2005, mostly as a backup to Niklas Bäckström.

Nashville Predators

Rinne was drafted 258th overall in the eighth round of the 2004 NHL Entry Draft by the Nashville Predators. He was signed by the Predators on 23 August 2005, and began his North American playing career with the Predators' top minor league affiliate, the Milwaukee Admirals of the American Hockey League (AHL). Initially, Rinne was slated to be the backup for Brian Finley, but Rinne became the starter as a consequence of Finley's poor play. In the summer of 2006, Rinne was "roughed up by a couple of unknown assailants" and during the fight, he dislocated his shoulder. As a result, he had to have surgery and missed the first four months of the season.

Rinne appeared in two NHL games with Nashville during the 2005–06 season. He compiled a record of 1–1–0 with a .900 save percentage and a goals against average (GAA) of 3.80.

Following Dan Ellis's stellar performance for Nashville in the 2007–08 season, starter Chris Mason was traded to the St. Louis Blues and Rinne was called up to serve as backup to Ellis for the subsequent 2008–09 season.

On 1 December 2008, Rinne became only the second Predators rookie goaltender ever to record a shutout. In February 2009, Rinne recorded 9 wins in 12 games and had a .944 save percentage and a 1.72 GAA. He was selected as the NHL Rookie of the Month for his performances. On 14 March, Rinne set a Predators franchise record with his seventh shutout of the season. Rinne was one of two goaltenders to play for Finland in the 2009 IIHF World Championship of hockey, the other being Karri Rämö. Rinne started the tournament with a shutout in his first game for the Finns, saving 30 shots.

In the 2010–11 season opener, Rinne allowed a goal before colliding with Anaheim Ducks forward Troy Bodie and suffering a lower-body injury on the play. Anders Lindbäck relieved him and went on to start three games before Rinne returned, only to go down to injury again in December. Upon returning on 23 December, Rinne remained healthy and put up some of the best numbers of his career, including a 1.71 GAA and .946 save percentage in January. At the conclusion of the season came many accolades; Rinne was named one of the three finalists for the Vezina Trophy, conferred to the NHL's top goaltender as judged by the NHL's general managers. He also finished fourth in Hart Memorial Trophy voting, as the NHL's most valuable player, and was named an NHL second team All-Star. Rinne led the Predators to their first ever Stanley Cup playoff series win in franchise history in 2011, prevailing over the Anaheim Ducks via a 4–2 series win.

After shutting-out the Ducks on 29 October 2011, Rinne set the mark for the Predators franchise record for shutouts, with 22. On Rinne's 29th birthday, 3 November 2011, he signed a seven-year $49 million contract, the largest contract in Nashville Predators team history (since surpassed by teammate Shea Weber and his 13-year, $114 million contract). That night, Rinne posted a 35-save shutout on the road against the Phoenix Coyotes. During the 2011–12 season, Rinne set a franchise record with 11 consecutive wins, passing Tomáš Vokoun's previous mark of eight. Rinne had another excellent year in 2011–12, leading the NHL in wins, shots against, saves and games played. On 25 April 2012, Rinne was again named a finalist for the Vezina Trophy for the second consecutive year. He also helped the Predators get past the Detroit Red Wings in the 2012 playoffs to win the series 4–1. However, Rinne and the Predators were unable to advance any further, falling to Phoenix in five games in the next round.

On 25 September 2012, Rinne joined Belarusian club Dinamo Minsk of the Kontinental Hockey League (KHL) due to the impending 2012–13 NHL lockout. However, he left Dinamo in December and returned to the Predators at the end of the lockout in January 2013 to begin the shortened, 48-game 2012–13 season.

In May 2013, Rinne had a hip arthroscopy. The hip then became infected on 24 October 2013, leaving Rinne off the ice and undergoing rigorous rehabilitation for the remainder of the year. He returned to action on 5 March 2014 against the Pittsburgh Penguins, allowing three goals in a 3–1 loss.

Rinne was a nominee for the 2015 Bill Masterton Memorial Trophy, which eventually went to veteran player Jaromír Jágr. Rinne was also a Vezina Trophy finalist in 2015, marking his third career nomination for the award; he lost to the Montreal Canadiens' Carey Price.

On 14 March 2015, Rinne became the fastest goaltender, in terms of games played, to record 30 wins in 39 games since the NHL adopted the shootout, and just the third goaltender in the NHL's expansion era to record 30 wins in 39 games or less.

On 16 March 2017, Rinne became the 67th goaltender to play at least 500 NHL games. On 22 May 2017, Rinne backstopped the Predators to the 2017 Stanley Cup Final by defeating the Anaheim Ducks four games to two. https://www.sportsnet.ca/hockey/nhl/predators-advance-stanley-cup-final-win-ducks/ The Predators lost the Stanley Cup Final against the Pittsburgh Penguins four games to two. https://www.tennessean.com/story/sports/nhl/predators/2017/06/12/predators-season-ends-game-6-loss-stanley-cup-final/387449001/

On 24 November 2017, the Predators defeated the St. Louis Blues 2–0; the shutout was the 45th of Rinne's career, making him the NHL's all-time leader amongst Finnish-born goaltenders. On 22 February 2018, Rinne became the 34th goaltender to record 300 career NHL wins following a 7–1 victory over the San Jose Sharks. When he recorded his 300th win, he had the third-highest win percentage of all goaltenders with at least 300 wins, at 54.34%, behind only Martin Brodeur and Marc-André Fleury. On 17 April, Rinne was again named a finalist for the Vezina Trophy, which he won on 20 June.

On 3 November 2018, Rinne signed a two-year, $10 million contract extension with Nashville. That night, as was the case in 2011, Rinne posted a 26-save shutout over the visiting Boston Bruins in Nashville.

On 9 January 2020, Rinne became the 12th goaltender in NHL history and the second goaltender in Predators history to score a goal, doing so against the Chicago Blackhawks by shooting the puck into the empty net from behind his team's goal line with less than 22 seconds left in the game.

On 10 May 2021, in the final game of the 2020–21 season, Rinne posted a 30-save shutout in a 5–0 win over the Carolina Hurricanes. It was his 369th career win, tying him for 19th all-time with Tom Barrasso. It was also his 60th career shutout, passing Evgeni Nabokov for 19th all-time on that list as well.

On 13 July 2021, Rinne announced his retirement from professional hockey. The Predators also announced that Rinne's number 35 jersey would be retired on 24 February 2022, making him the first player in team history to receive the honor.

International play

In May 2014, Rinne was named to the All-Star team and selected as the Most Valuable Player of the 2014 IIHF World Championship as Finland claimed the silver medal. Rinne also participated in the 2015 IIHF World Championship the following year and was named the tournament's best goaltender, setting a new International Ice Hockey Federation (IIHF) record for minutes played without allowing a goal.

In March 2016, Rinne was named to Finland's 2016 World Cup of Hockey roster. He played in one out of three tournament games and in two out of three pre-tournament games.

Playing style
Rinne utilized the popular butterfly style of goaltending, dropping to his knees early and using his leg pads to block low shot attempts. At 6' 5" (1.96m), Rinne was the among the tallest goaltenders in the league, which gave him tremendous reach with his stick and leg pads. For a tall goaltender, he utilized great footwork, had a great glove hand, but played with a smaller stick than most goaltenders did.

Personal life
Rinne is the son of Jukka and Helena Rinne, and he has two sisters, Anna and Päivi. As a child, Rinne idolized John Vanbiesbrouck.

Rinne was engaged to The Voice of Finland contestant Kirsi Lehtosaari in April 2013. Lehtosaari reported in engagement announcements that living in a music city like Nashville helped her aspiration to become a pop star. She planned to continue her music interests in Nashville until the end of Rinne's NHL career. Rinne, likewise, planned to return to Finland after his retirement. However, their engagement was called off around July 2015.

Rinne has one son, Paulus, with his fiancée, Erika.

Career statistics

Regular season and playoffs

International

Awards

NHL

International

SM-Liiga

References

External links

 
 Pekka Rinne on nhlfinns.net
 Pekka Rinne @ hockeysfuture.com

1982 births
Living people
Finnish expatriate ice hockey players in the United States
Finnish ice hockey goaltenders
HC Dinamo Minsk players
Hokki players
King Clancy Memorial Trophy winners
Milwaukee Admirals players
Nashville Predators draft picks
Nashville Predators players
National Hockey League All-Stars
Oulun Kärpät players
People from Kempele
Sportspeople from North Ostrobothnia
Vezina Trophy winners
Finnish expatriate ice hockey players in Belarus